Troyan Radulov (born 4 February 1974) is a former Bulgarian footballer who played as a midfielder and is currently the Bulgarian women national team and the Bulgarian national women team u17 coach.

In his career Radulov played as a midfielder for Slavia Sofia, Vidima-Rakovski Sevlievo, Spartak Varna and Akademik Sofia in the Bulgarian A Professional Football Group.

References

External links
 

1974 births
Living people
Bulgarian footballers
First Professional Football League (Bulgaria) players
FC Septemvri Sofia players
PFC Slavia Sofia players
PFC Vidima-Rakovski Sevlievo players
PFC Spartak Varna players
Akademik Sofia players
Association football midfielders